Olivia Doherty (born 6 January 1982) is an Australian team handball player. She played for the club Melbourne HC, and on the Australian national team. She represented Australia at the 2003, 2005, 2007, and 2013 World Women's Handball Championships. In 2018, Doherty was the team manager for the Australia women's national beach handball team at the 2018 Women's Beach Handball World Championships. She is now heading the sports department at Melbourne High School.

References

Australian female handball players
1982 births
Living people